Ojok-tong is a village located in Uiju, North Pyongan Province, North Korea. It has a population of around 54,767 residents.

References

Villages in North Korea
North Pyongan